Euhyparpax is a genus of moths of the family Notodontidae, the prominents. The genus was erected by Edna Libby Beutenmüller in 1893.

There are two species:
Euhyparpax amatame  (Dyar, 1916) 
Euhyparpax rosea Beutenmüller, 1893

References

Notodontidae